Clan Erskine is a Scottish clan of the Scottish Lowlands.

History

Origins of Clan Erskine
The surname Erskine was originally derived from the lands of Erskine, which is an area to the south of the River Clyde in Renfrew. The name is believed to be ancient or Old British for green rising ground.

As early as the reign of Alexander II of Scotland, Henry de Erskine was proprietor of the barony. In about 1226 Henry was a witness to a charter by the Earl of Lennox of the patronage and tithes of Rosneath to Paisley Abbey.

Wars of Scottish Independence

John de Irskyn was amongst the Scottish nobles who submitted to Edward I of England and appears on the Ragman Rolls of 1296. His son, another Sir John de Irskyn had three daughters. The eldest daughter married Thomas Bruce, the brother of king Robert the Bruce. Sir John de Irskyn's second daughter married Walter, the High Steward of Scotland.

14th century

The Erskines were staunch supporters of the Clan Bruce. Sir Robert de Erskine was an illustrious and renowned figure of his time. David II of Scotland appointed him keeper of the strategic Stirling Castle. In 1350 Sir Robert Erskine was appointed as Chamberlain of Scotland and justicar north of the Forth. Erskine was also one of the nobles who established the succession to the throne of Robert II of Scotland, who was a grandson of the great Robert the Bruce and the first monarch of the Stewart dynasty in 1371.

15th and 16th centuries

In the mid 15th century when Alexander Stewart, Earl of Mar died the Clan Erskine chief claimed the title, which was one of the great Celtic titles. Stewart had claimed the title through his wife, the Countess of Mar. Sir Robert Erskine, who had been created Lord Erskine claimed the title through his descent from the Countess of Mar. Erskine's claim was refused by the king who said that the title belonged to the crown because the last male holder had been a Stewart. However the Erskines became guardians to the young James IV of Scotland despite this dispute with the king. Five successive generations of Erskines were guardians of the royals.

In 1497 Alexander Erskine, third Lord Erskine constructed Alloa Tower, a massive tower that would be the seat of the clan chiefs for the next three hundred years. The third Lord Erskine's son was killed in 1513 at the Battle of Flodden. John Erskine, fifth Lord Erskine was guardian and tutor of James V of Scotland.

Mary, Queen of Scots had spent the first five years of her life around Alloa and Stirling Castle. She later bestowed upon the sixth Lord Erskine the title of Earl of Mar. Erskine was descended from Elyne, daughter of Gratney, 7th Earl of Mar. Although the Erskine chiefs are Earls of Mar and Kellie there is a separate Countess of Mar (chief of Clan Mar), who is a member of the Council of the Chiefs.

The seventh Lord Erskine took part in the Raid of Ruthven in 1582, in which the young James VI of Scotland was placed in the hands of an extremist faction of Protestant nobility for nearly a year. As a result, Erskine was exiled but was later restored to royal favour and in 1616 was made Lord High Treasurer of Scotland.

17th century & Civil War 

In 1615 Chief John Erskine, 20th Earl of Mar was appointed governor of Edinburgh Castle. He supported Charles I. Lord Erskine fought for the royalists at the Battle of Kilsyth in 1645. The family estates were forfeited for their support of the royalists but were later restored by Charles II in 1660.

18th century and Jacobite risings

John Erskine, Earl of Mar was known as bobbing John due to his change of political allegiance in accordance with the needs of survival that was not unknown to the Scottish nobility. He had been a supporter of the Union, however when he attended court in London in 1714 he was not offered the post of Secretary of State for Scotland, which he considered to be an insult. He returned to his ancestral lands and raised the standard of James VIII (The Old Pretender), he called out his own clansmen and all loyal supporters of the House of Stuart. Erskine had soon gathered an army of over ten thousand clansmen. The earl led his army of Jacobites at the Battle of Sheriffmuir against the Duke of Argyll, which was fought on 13 November 1715. The battle was inconclusive although Argyll claimed victory. The Jacobite rising was a failure and Erskine, Earl of Mar fled to France. His title and lands were forfeited and in 1724 were purchased by another branch of the family. The earl had received the Jacobite title of Mar but this was abandoned in 1824 when the Erskines were restored to the earldom of Mar. The earldom of Kellie became united with the earldom of Mar in 1835. Kellie had originally been bestowed in 1619 on a younger son of the chiefly line.

Clan Chief

The current Chief of Clan Erskine is James Erskine, 14th Earl of Mar who descends from the Earls of Mar, seventh Creation (1565) (as deemed by the House of Lords in 1875). He is chief of the name and arms of Erskine.

The Clan Mar now has a separate chief; Margaret of Mar, 31st Countess of Mar who descends from the Earls of Mar, first creation (1404) (as deemed by Act of Parliament in 1885). She is chief of the name and arms of Mar.

Tartan

Clan Castles

Alloa Tower was the main seat of the chief of Clan Erskine.
The House of Dun and the Dun Estate was home to the Clan Erskine family from 1375 until 1980, but archaeological evidence shows that people have lived here for at least 9,000 years. John Erskine of Dun was a key figure in the Scottish Reformation.
Corgarff Castle was acquired by John Erskine, 19th Earl of Mar in 1626. 
Kellie Castle was purchased by Sir Thomas Erskine in 1613. 
Dryburgh Abbey was given to the Earl of Mar by King James VI of Scotland in 1544.
Dirleton Castle
Braemar Castle
Rosslyn Castle
Dunimarle Castle, near Culross, Fife, was built by the Erskine family in the 18th century.
Kildrummy Castle was the seat of the original Earls of Mar. It was abandoned after the failed Jacobite Uprisings in 1716.

Family tree

Representations in popular culture
 Elizabeth Peters' 1976 romantic suspense novel, Legend in Green Velvet, prominently featured a (fictional) member of Clan Erskine, as well as the castle and Clan history.

See also

Scottish clan

References

Scottish clans

External links
https://web.archive.org/web/20060813124422/http://www.scotclans.com/clans/Erskine/history.html
http://www.electricscotland.com/webclans/dtog/erskine2.html

 
Erskine
Scottish Lowlands